Boniyar is a tehsil located in Baramulla district, Jammu and Kashmir, India. The town of Boniyar is the administrative center. There are 52 villages that are part of the tehsil including Kathal Hil Patribal.

References 

Baramulla district
Tehsils of India